Reese Mishler (born April 20, 1991) is an American actor. He is best known for his role in the film The Gallows (2015).

Filmography

Film

Television

Awards and nominations

References

External links
 

1991 births
Living people
American male film actors
American male television actors
21st-century American male actors
Male actors from Oklahoma
People from Owasso, Oklahoma
DePaul University alumni